{{DISPLAYTITLE:C21H24O11}}
The molecular formula C21H24O11 (molar mass: 452.41 g/mol, exact mass: 452.131862 u) may refer to:

 Aspalathin, a dihydrochalcone glucoside
 Catechin-5-O-glucoside, a flavan-3-ol glucoside
 Catechin-7-O-glucoside, a flavan-3-ol glucoside

Molecular formulas